Franck Histilloles (born 25 January 1973) is a former footballer who played as a midfielder for clubs in France and Greece.

Playing career
Born in Forbach, Histilloles began his career playing for the youth team of FC Girondins de Bordeaux. In 1994, he made his Ligue 1 debut with Bordeaux at age 20. After three seasons with the club, he moved to fellow Ligue 1 club FC Metz. Two seasons later, he joined Ligue 2 club US Créteil-Lusitanos.

In December 2001, Créteil ran into financial difficulties and Histilloles left on a free transfer for Greek Superleague side Panachaiki F.C. He would spend 1.5 season with Panachaiki, appearing in 36 league matches for the club.

Histilloles returned to France and would finish his career playing in the lower levels of French football.

References

External links

1973 births
Living people
Association football midfielders
French footballers
FC Girondins de Bordeaux players
FC Metz players
US Créteil-Lusitanos players
Panachaiki F.C. players
FC Martigues players
Aviron Bayonnais FC players
Ligue 1 players
Ligue 2 players
People from Forbach
Footballers from Grand Est
Sportspeople from Moselle (department)
French expatriate sportspeople in Greece
Expatriate footballers in Greece
French expatriate footballers